Rosetti Handbags and Accessories Ltd. (simply known as Rosetti) designs, markets, and sells women's handbags, purses, and related accessories. Founded in 1994, the company is headquartered in New York City. Rosetti is an accessories fashion brand, in comparison to other fashion brands, such as Coach and Gucci.

References

External links 
 Rosetti website

American companies established in 1994
Manufacturing companies established in 1994
Design companies established in 1994
Bags (fashion)
Fashion accessory brands
1990s fashion
2000s fashion
2010s fashion
Companies based in New York City